Lansium is a genus of plants in the family Meliaceae, containing at least three species. The species Lansium parasiticum (synonym L. domesticum Corrêa) is a tropical fruit-bearing tree that is cultivated in tropical Southeast Asia, and on a much smaller scale elsewhere in the tropics. Other previously named species are now placed in the genera Aglaia and Reinwardtiodendron.

Taxonomy and related genera
The genus was named in 1807 by the Portuguese botanist José Francisco Corrêa da Serra. As of 2021, the Catalogue of Life recognizes three species of Lansium.
Lansium breviracemosum Kosterm.
Lansium domesticum Corrêa
Lansium membranaceum (Kosterm.) Mabb.

Phylogenetic studies suggest the following relationships amongst closely related genera:

References

Meliaceae
Monotypic Sapindales genera
Meliaceae genera